Antonis Anastasiou (born 13 September 1996) is a Greek professional footballer who plays as a left-back for Super League 2 club Niki Volos.

References

1996 births
Living people
Greece under-21 international footballers
Greece youth international footballers
Super League Greece players
Football League (Greece) players
Super League Greece 2 players
Acharnaikos F.C. players
PAE Kerkyra players
Doxa Drama F.C. players
Egaleo F.C. players
Niki Volos F.C. players
Association football defenders
Footballers from Athens
Greek footballers